Robert Carter Jett (May 10, 1865 – August 9, 1950) was bishop of the Episcopal Diocese of Southwestern Virginia from 1920 to 1938.

Early life and education
Jett was born May 10, 1865, in King George County, Virginia, the son of William Newton Jett and Virginia Mitchell. he was educated at the public and private schools. he also studied at the Virginia Theological Seminary from where he graduated in 1889. He was granted an honorary Doctor of Divinity from Washington and Lee University in 1915.

Ordained Ministry
Jett was ordained deacon in 1898 by Bishop Francis McNeece Whittle and priest in 1890 by Bishop Alfred Magill Randolph. He served as assistant at Epiphany Church in Danville, Virginia from 1889 to 1890, and then became rector of Beckford Parish in Shenandoah County, Virginia from 1890 to 1893. In 1893 he became the first rector of Emmanuel Church in Staunton, Virginia, a post he retained till 1913 when he resigned to organize and eventually establish the Virginia Episcopal School, of which he served as its first rector from 1916 to 1920.

Bishop
On December 10, 1920, Jett was elected the first Bishop of Southwestern Virginia. He was consecrated on March 24, 1920, in Trinity Church, Staunton, Virginia, by Presiding Bishop Daniel S. Tuttle. In the first year of his episcopacy, Jett established a diocesan newspaper. He was deeply involved in community activities as an integral part of Christian commitment. Jett worked tirelessly, patiently, and faithfully to carry on the evangelical and missionary tradition of the Church in Virginia. He did his work well, and he left behind him a strong and well-grounded diocese. He retired on May 17, 1938.

References

External links 
 

1865 births
1950 deaths
Episcopal bishops of Southwestern Virginia
Virginia Theological Seminary alumni
People from King George County, Virginia